Pramila Jayapal (born September 21, 1965) is an American politician serving as the U.S. representative from  since 2017. A member of the Democratic Party, she represents most of Seattle, as well as some suburban areas of King County. Jayapal represented the 37th legislative district in the Washington State Senate from 2015 to 2017. She is the first Indian-American woman to serve in the U.S. House of Representatives. The district's first female member of Congress, she is also the first Asian American to represent Washington at the federal level.

Before entering electoral politics, Jayapal was a Seattle-based civil rights activist, serving until 2012 as the executive director of OneAmerica, a pro-immigrant advocacy group. She founded the organization, originally called Hate Free Zone, after the September 11 attacks. Jayapal co-chaired the Congressional Progressive Caucus from 2019 to 2021, henceforth serving as chair. She serves on both the Judiciary Committee and Budget Committee.

Early life and education 
Jayapal was born into a Malayali family in Chennai, India, to Maya Jayapal, a writer, and Jayapal Menon, a marketing professional. She spent most of her childhood in Indonesia and Singapore. She immigrated to the U.S. in 1982, at age 16, to attend college. She earned a BA from Georgetown University and an MBA from the Kellogg School of Management at Northwestern University.

Jayapal worked for PaineWebber as a financial analyst after graduating from college. At PaineWebber, she began to work on development projects from Chicago to Thailand. Later, she briefly worked in sales and marketing for a medical company before moving into the public sector in 1991.

Early career

Advocacy work
Jayapal founded Hate Free Zone after the 2001 September 11 attacks as an advocacy group for immigrant groups. Hate Free Zone registered new American citizens to vote and lobbied on immigration reform and related issues. It successfully sued the Bush Administration's Immigration and Naturalization Services to prevent the deportation of over 4,000 Somalis across the country. The group changed its name to OneAmerica in 2008. Jayapal stepped down from her leadership position in May 2012. In 2013, she was recognized by the White House as a "Champion of Change."

On June 29, 2018, Jayapal participated in Women Disobey and the sit-in at the Hart Senate Office Building to protest the Trump administration's “zero-tolerance” approach to illegal immigration. The protest resulted in the arrest of over 500 people, including Jayapal. She said she was "proud to have been arrested" for protesting the administration's "inhumane and cruel" policy.

Washington legislature 

Jayapal served on the Mayoral Advisory Committee that negotiated Seattle's $15 minimum wage and co-chaired the mayor's police chief search committee, which resulted in the unanimous selection of the city's first female police chief.

After State Senator Adam Kline announced his retirement in early 2014, Jayapal entered the race to succeed him. She was endorsed by Seattle Mayor Ed Murray and won more than 51% of the vote in the August 5 primary, out of a field of six candidates. She defeated fellow Democrat Louis Watanabe in November.

In the Washington State Senate, Jayapal was the primary sponsor of SB 5863, which directs the Washington State Department of Transportation to administer a pre-apprenticeship program targeting women and people of color; the bill passed into law in July 2015. She co-sponsored a bill to test and track thousands of police department rape kits.

Jayapal endorsed Senator Bernie Sanders for President of the United States in the 2016 Democratic primaries.

U.S. House of Representatives

Elections 
In January 2016, Jayapal declared her candidacy for Congress in Washington's 7th congressional district, after Representative Jim McDermott announced his retirement. In April, she was endorsed by Bernie Sanders. On August 2, Jayapal finished first in the top-two primary, alongside state representative Brady Walkinshaw, also a Democrat. This was the first time in the state's history that a federal seat was contested by two Democrats. Both identified as progressive Democrats. The 7th is the most Democratic district in the Pacific Northwest, and the seat was all but certain to stay in Democratic hands even if a Republican took the second spot in the primary.

In the final weeks of the race, Jayapal and her supporters contested claims from Walkinshaw that she had not advanced enough legislation. Jayapal won the general election with 56% of the vote.

Tenure

Jayapal became the first Indian-American woman to serve in the U.S. House of Representatives.

On January 6, 2017, Jayapal objected to Georgia's 16 electoral votes, which Donald Trump had won by over 200,000 votes. Because no senator joined her objection, the objection was dismissed.

Jayapal and Representative Jamie Raskin introduced the Trump Transparency Package, a series of bills aimed at promoting transparency and eliminating conflicts of interest in the Trump White House. Jayapal and her fellow co-chairs of the United for Climate and Environmental Justice Task Force also introduced a package of environmental justice bills to fight the impact of climate change on frontline communities. She supports universal health care and co-sponsored the Expanded and Improved Medicare For All Act. On April 16, 2018, Jayapal joined Justice Democrats.

During Trump's inauguration, Jayapal met with constituents in her congressional district instead of attending the ceremony. The Nation called her "a leader of the resistance," quoting Minority Leader Nancy Pelosi calling Jayapal "a rising star in the Democratic caucus." In September, Representative Don Young apologized to her after calling her "young lady" in an exchange that went viral. Jayapal has described facing sexism from colleagues in Congress.

Jayapal is a co-sponsor of legislation intended to make public colleges and universities tuition-free for most families and to significantly reduce student debt.

Jayapal voted against a House resolution condemning the U.N. Security Council resolution on Israeli settlements built on the occupied Palestinian territories in the West Bank. In July 2019, she voted against a House resolution condemning the Boycott, Divestment, and Sanctions movement targeting Israel. The resolution passed 398–17.

On April 25, 2018, 57 members of the House of Representatives, including Jayapal, released a condemnation of Holocaust distortion in Ukraine and Poland. They criticized Poland's new Holocaust law, which would criminalize accusing Poles (as a nation) of complicity in the Holocaust, and Ukraine's 2015 memory laws glorifying the Ukrainian Insurgent Army (UPA) and its pro-Nazi leaders, such as Roman Shukhevych.

In February 2019, Jayapal sponsored and introduced the Medicare for All Act of 2019 with more than 100 co-sponsors. The bill would create a publicly financed comprehensive, universal, and guaranteed health care insurance system for every U.S. resident. It represented the continuation of progressives' long-term campaign in Congress to introduce a guaranteed health care system. In 2021, Jayapal introduced similar legislation for the 117th Congress.

In April 2019, after the House passed the resolution withdrawing American support for the Saudi-led coalition in Yemen, Jayapal was one of nine lawmakers to sign a letter to Trump requesting a meeting with him and urging him to sign "Senate Joint Resolution 7, which invokes the War Powers Act of 1973 to end unauthorized US military participation in the Saudi-led coalition's armed conflict against Yemen's Houthi forces, initiated in 2015 by the Obama administration." They asserted the "Saudi-led coalition's imposition of an air-land-and-sea blockade as part of its war against Yemen’s Houthis has continued to prevent the unimpeded distribution of these vital commodities, contributing to the suffering and death of vast numbers of civilians throughout the country" and that Trump's approval of the resolution through his signing would give a "powerful signal to the Saudi-led coalition to bring the four-year-old war to a close".

In December 2019, Jayapal introduced a bill to urge India to lift curbs on communications in Kashmir. These curbs were introduced as part of revocation of the special status of Jammu and Kashmir in August 2019. Later that month, the Foreign Minister of India canceled a meeting with U.S. lawmakers, citing Jayapal's inclusion on the invitee list. The bill has seen no movement since its introduction in Congress.

On January 20, 2020, Jayapal endorsed Senator Bernie Sanders in the 2020 Democratic presidential primaries.

Jayapal supports decreasing U.S. military spending. She, Barbara Lee and Mark Pocan attempted to reduce the size of the $740 billion National Defense Authorization Act for Fiscal Year 2021, but their motion was rejected 93-324.

Jayapal is a supporter of Illinois Rep. Jesús "Chuy" García's New Way Forward Act, which calls for immigration reform.

Jayapal is also a supporter of the Equal Rights Amendment.

In September 2021, BuzzFeed reported that 14 former staffers had described Jayapal's congressional office as a volatile and dysfunctional workplace. Jayapal's office responded with a statement calling the allegations "sexist", "ugly stereotypes", and lacking context.

An October 24, 2022 letter, led by Jayapal and signed by 30 progressive Democrats, called on President Biden to pursue negotiations with Vladimir Putin to end the invasion of Ukraine. The letter was withdrawn a day later after Jayapal said it was drafted months ago and was released by a staffer "without vetting". The reason for the retraction was disputed, and Politico reported that Jayapal approved the letter's release on October 24.

Leadership posts 
 Senior Whip, Democratic Caucus of the United States House of Representatives
 Vice Ranking Member, United States House Committee on the Budget
 Chair, Congressional Progressive Caucus
 Co-chair and co-founder, United for Climate and Environmental Justice Task Force
 Chair, Immigration Task Force, Congressional Asian Pacific American Caucus (CAPAC)
 Co-chair, Women's Working Group on Immigration Reform
 DNC Transition Team Member

Committee memberships 
 Committee on the Judiciary
 Subcommittee on Immigration and Citizenship
 Subcommittee on Antitrust, Commercial and Administrative Law
 Committee on Education and Labor
 Subcommittee on Higher Education and Workforce Development
 Subcommittee on Workforce Protections
 Committee on the Budget

Caucus memberships
 Congressional Asian Pacific American Caucus
 Medicare for All Caucus
 Congressional Freethought Caucus
 Congressional LGBTQ+ Equality Caucus (vice chair)
 Congressional Progressive Caucus (chair)

Personal life
Jayapal initially lost her Green Card when she gave birth prematurely in India during a visit with her husband, unable to return in time to maintain Permanent Resident status. She later became a U.S. citizen in 2000. She is the author of Pilgrimage: One Woman's Return to a Changing India, published in March 2000.

Jayapal lives in Seattle with her husband, Steven R. Williamson. Kashika, Jayapal's daughter from a previous marriage, is transgender and previously identified as gender non-binary. She also has a stepson, Michael. In 2019, Jayapal publicly wrote that she had chosen to abort a pregnancy because the pregnancy would risk her and the unborn child's health.

Jayapal's older sister Susheela has served on the Multnomah County Commission since 2019.

Jayapal tested positive for COVID-19 on January 11, 2021. In a statement released after her diagnosis, she criticized her Republican colleagues for refusing to wear masks when members of Congress were placed on lockdown during the 2021 United States Capitol attack.

On July 9, 2022, Seattle resident Brett Forsell was arrested after he arrived at Jayapal's Seattle house and yelled obscenities and threats at her. Forsell was released and charged when more evidence had been collected. Forsell had driven by her house repeatedly over a period of weeks, shouting insults. When arrested, he was armed with a handgun with a round in its chamber. He was charged with felony stalking, and released on $150,000 bail.

Electoral history

See also

Notes

References

External links

|-

|-

1965 births
20th-century American writers
20th-century American women writers
21st-century American politicians
21st-century American women politicians
American people of Malayali descent
American politicians of Indian descent
Asian-American people in Washington (state) politics
American women writers of Indian descent
American civil rights activists
Women civil rights activists
Female members of the United States House of Representatives
Georgetown University alumni
Indian emigrants to the United States
Living people
Members of the United States Congress of Indian descent
Asian-American members of the United States House of Representatives
Northwestern University alumni
Politicians from Chennai
Politicians from Seattle
Democratic Party Washington (state) state senators
Women state legislators in Washington (state)
Naturalized citizens of the United States
Equal Rights Amendment
Democratic Party members of the United States House of Representatives from Washington (state)